The original Purila Manor was first mentioned in 1513.  It was built in Purila, Rapla County and was rebuilt in 1810. It was used by Estonian aristocracy, including Friedrich Gustav von Helffreich, until the 20th century when it was used for education. After World War II it was used by the Soviet Army, including the 8th Estonian Rifle Corps from 1953 to 1957.

References

Gallery

Rapla Parish
Manor houses in Estonia
Buildings and structures in Rapla County